Arkavin (also Romanized as Arkavīn) is a village in Baba Jik Rural District, in the Central District of Chaldoran County, West Azerbaijan Province, Iran. At the 2006 census, its population was 122, in 18 families.

Name 
According to Vladimir Minorsky, the name "Arkavin" is derived from the Mongolian name for Christians, erkeün.

References 

Populated places in Chaldoran County